Interlochen State Park is a public recreation area covering  between Green Lake and Duck Lake in Grand Traverse County, Michigan. It was the State of Michigan's first officially recognized state park. It was established by the Michigan Legislature in 1917; $60,000 was paid for the land. Originally named Pine Park, the park was created to preserve for future generations the virgin pine (Pinus strobus) stand.  It is one of the few easily reached places in Michigan where old-growth (pre-European settlement) red pine can be found.

In 1928, the National Music Camp was established on the property adjoining the northern boundary of the park. It is located next to the Interlochen Center for the Arts.

Also popular at Interlochen State Park is the Three Discipline Triathlon Event hosted each July.

Activities and amenities
The park offers swimming, playground, year-round fishing, picnicking, camping, and three boat launches.

See also
Hartwick Pines State Park for the other stand of virgin eastern white pine in the Lower Peninsula.

References

External links
Interlochen State Park Michigan Department of Natural Resources 
Interlochen State Park Map Michigan Department of Natural Resources

State parks of Michigan
Protected areas of Grand Traverse County, Michigan
Protected areas established in 1919
1919 establishments in Michigan
IUCN Category III